The 1962 Central Michigan Chippewas football team represented Central Michigan University in the Interstate Intercollegiate Athletic Conference (IIAC) during the 1962 NCAA College Division football season.  In their 12th season under head coach Kenneth Kelly, the Chippewas compiled a 6–4 record (4–0 against IIAC opponents), won the IIAC championship, and outscored their opponents by a combined total of 209 to 195.

The team's statistical leaders included quarterback Dick Moffit with 1,109 passing yards, Bill Shuple with 640 rushing yards, and halfback Gary Finnin with 361 receiving yards. Offensive guard Ralph Sofferdine and halfback Larry Moore received the team's most valuable player award. Five Central Michigan players (Moffit, Sofferdine, Moore, and defensive tackles George Alward and Uwe Wiese) received first-team honors on the All-IIAC team.

Schedule

See also
 1962 in Michigan

References

Central Michigan
Central Michigan Chippewas football seasons
Interstate Intercollegiate Athletic Conference football champion seasons
Central Michigan Chippewas football